Arvid Pettersson (31 March 1893 – 7 May 1956) was a Swedish cyclist. He competed in two events at the 1912 Summer Olympics.

References

External links
 

1893 births
1956 deaths
Swedish male cyclists
Olympic cyclists of Sweden
Cyclists at the 1912 Summer Olympics
People from Töreboda Municipality
Sportspeople from Västra Götaland County